Margareta Hansdotter, also called Säbråzynthia (1594–1657), was a Swedish vicar's wife famous in history by the name Stormor i Dalom (The Great Mother of Dalom). She was given the name Stormor i Dalom during her own lifetime because of her good heart and charitable nature toward the poor, as well as for her many children.

Life
Stormor i Dalom was born to Johannes Laurentii, vicar of Säbrå parish in Ångermanland, and thereby the cousin of the mathematician Andreas Bureus and the sister of bishop Jacobus Johannis Zebrozynthius.

In 1610, she married Elof Terserus (1554-1617), vicar of Leksand, and in 1618, she married the successor of her late spouse, Uno Troilus (1586-1654), through Widow Conservation. 
Stormor was known and loved for her great kindness: upon her death, a farmer alongside the road famously said: "Should I not cry, when the Great Mother in Dalom is dead?", a tribute to her favorable reputation of motherly goodness, which was mentioned in the sermon of her funeral.

Legacy
She is known as the matriarch of a large number of Swedish families: Arborelius, Floderus, Geijer, Holmgren, Key, Munktell, Staaff, Stridsberg, Troilius, von Troil and Trygger.

During the age of the eugenics of the 1930s, she was given as an example for the eugenic belief that virtue and success could be inherited.

References

 Munktell: Västerås Stifts Herdaminne
 Lilla Focus. Focus Uppslagsböcker AB, Stockholm.  Lund, 1979 [Lilla Focus Encyclopedia]

1594 births
17th-century Swedish people
1657 deaths
People of the Swedish Empire